Marc A. Raab (born January 26, 1969) is an American former professional football player who was an offensive lineman in the National Football League (NFL).

Early life
Despite growing up in the San Diego area in California, Raab was a Washington Redskins fan. His grandfather was a trainer and equipment manager for the team in the 1930s.

Raab attended and played high school football at Helix High School in La Mesa, California.

College career
He played college football at the University of Southern California, where he was a long snapper for the Trojans.

Professional career
Raab played in the NFL for the Washington Redskins and the San Diego Chargers.

References

1969 births
Living people
Players of American football from San Diego
American football centers
USC Trojans football players
San Diego Chargers players
Washington Redskins players